is a Japanese actor, singer, and radio personality. He is regarded as a Japanese icon after achieving success as an actor. He was also a popular member of SMAP, one of the best-selling boy bands in Asia.

A 1996 television drama series, Long Vacation, in which he landed his first lead role, became a massive success, creating a phrase called the "Lon-bake phenomenon". He was given the title, "The King of Ratings", as his subsequent television series continued to generate high ratings and each show became a social phenomenon as it aired. Five of his works are ranked in the 10 best-viewed TV drama series in Japan, the highest of which is his 2001 drama series, Hero. He also starred in blockbuster films, including Love and Honor (2006), Hero (2007) and Howl's Moving Castle (as a voice actor, 2004).

Kimura is also known for his work in the video games Judgment and Lost Judgment, portraying Takayuki Yagami.

Career

Music

In 1987, at age 15, Kimura auditioned to enter Johnny & Associates, a talent agency that recruits and trains young boys to become singers and members of boy bands. In Autumn 1987, twenty young boys, including Kimura, were put together into a group called The Skate Boys, which was initially created as backup dancers for a famous boy band, Hikaru Genji. In April 1988, producer Johnny Kitagawa chose six out of the twenty boys to create a new boy band; "SMAP."

In 2020, Kimura released his first solo album, entitled "Go with the Flow". The album, which included songs written for Kimura by well-known bands and artists such as [ALEXANDROS], Superfly, Noriyuki Makihara, and Love Psychedelico, debuted at #1 on the Oricon Albums Chart on the week of its release. A month later, he held a four-day tour in both Tokyo and Osaka entitled "TAKUYA KIMURA Live Tour 2020 Go with the Flow". The concert was released on Blu-Ray and DVD, on July 8, 2020, debuting at #1 as well on the Oricon Charts.

On May 20, 2021, the Weibo Starlight Awards 2020 ceremony was held online. Kimura, alongside his two daughters, Cocomi and Kōki, were awarded alongside Western artists such as Katy Perry, Taylor Swift, and Louis Koo.

A follow up to his solo album "Go with the Flow" was released on January 19, 2022, entitled "Next Destination". The album features the song entitled "Mojo Drive", a collaboration between Kimura and renowned city-pop artist Tatsuro Yamashita, who wanted to write a song to highlight Kimura's baritone voice after attending his solo concert in February. Yamashita also composed two other tracks, namely "Good Luck, Good Time", and "Morning Dew" for the album. In addition to Yamashita, "Next Destination" also features songs written by Kyōka Suzuki, Sanma Akashiya, Man with a Mission, and Shigesato Itoi.

Acting
In 1988, Kimura made his acting debut in a television series, Abunai Shonen III, along with his band members. After appearing in several television series, he first attracted attention after landing a role in a high-rated television series, Asunaro Hakusho, in 1993. The scene where he hugged his co-star Hikari Ishida from behind became popular in Japan and a man hugging a girl from behind was later named "asunaro daki", meaning "asunaro hug". From 1994, men in Japan started copying his fashion and style, as clothes and fashion items became instant hits, the thick, black-rimmed glasses he wore in Asunaro Hakusho, being one of them. The phenomenon was collectively called the "Kimutaku syndrome". He won the Ishihara Yujiro New Artist Award for his performance in Shoot, in which he made his screen debut.

He first landed the lead role in Long Vacation in 1996. The series, which aired every Monday night, saw massive success and was the highest-rated program that year, thus becoming a social phenomenon. Media stated that, "women disappear from the city on Mondays", pointing out the large viewership and how intoxicating the show was for women in Japan. After Kimura playing a young pianist, there was a rapid increase of young men who started taking piano lessons. The cultural impact and influences of the show is commonly referred to as the "Lonvaca (ron-bake) phenomenon". This was also a breakthrough for Kimura as an actor and helped him gain recognition and a more broad fan base.

In 2000, he starred in a television series, Beautiful Life, which became a massive hit, with the final episode marking above the 40% household share rating and becoming the highest-rated program for that slot (Sunday 9:00pm). In 2001, Kimura starred in Hero, which became the all-time highest-rated television series in Japan and the only program in history to have all episodes mark above the 30% household share rating. Subsequent television series, such as Good Luck!!, Pride and Engine, also generated high-ratings. Five of his most successful television series, Hero (2001), Beautiful Life (2000), Love Generation (1997), Good Luck!! (2003), and Long Vacation (1996) are ranked in the top ten highest-rated television series in Japanese history.

In 2004, he played a supporting role in a Cannes-nominated film 2046, and walked the red carpet of Cannes Festival for the first time.  Kimura also voiced Howl Pendragon, the titular character of Studio Ghibli's Howl's Moving Castle in 2004. He was the lead actor in Love and Honor (2006). Although he was nominated for numerous prestigious awards for Love and Honor, including the Japan Academy Award, his agency, Johnny & Associates, declined all nominations, though some organizations still announced him as the winner, such as the Tokyo Sports Film Awards, headed by Takeshi Kitano and Cinema Junpo. Earning over 40.3 billion yen, the film became the biggest hit for director Yoji Yamada during his four-decade career, as well as becoming the biggest box-office earner in Shochiku's history.

In Blade of the Immortal (2017), Takashi Miike cast Kimura for the role as he found him fitting due to Kimura's personal life and the differences he has with the other members of the music group SMAP. Additionally, since Kimura was also popular within Japanese fandom for over two decades by the time the film was made, he felt that his appeal would attract a bigger audience. When Miike asked his team about what they thought of Kimura playing the role of Manji, the team reacted negatively, believing that he would not be able to portray Manji. However, Miike still felt that due to Kimura's experience in films, he has suitable to play the leading role in the movie.

He said that he personally selected Kimura, "a superstar who made the transition from the Showa era to the Heisei era," as "the world's strongest member of the Miike Gang, the Ittō-ryū fighting school of our film industry." Kimura expressed multiple thoughts about his acting as Manji, such as how he deals with make up and action sequences. However, Kimura suffered a major wound while filming, resulting in him not being able to walk for various days. Blade of the Immortal was eventually screened out-of-competition at the Cannes Festival, making this Kimura's second appearance at the event.

In 2021, it was announced that Kimura would be starring in the television adaption of German author Frank Schätzing's environmental thriller, The Swarm. The series is now in post-production.

In 2022, Kimura was announced to star as historical figure Oda Nobunaga alongside Haruka Ayase as Nohime in The Legend and Butterfly, a film to commemorate Toei's 70th Anniversary in 2023. This is the first time Kimura has portrayed Nobunaga in 25 years, following his first appearance as the 16th century samurai in the 1998 historical drama "Nobunaga Oda: The Fool Who Takes The World" for TBS. The film is scheduled released on January 27, 2023, and is directed by Keishi Otomo and written by Ryota Kosawa. On November 6, 2022, Kimura made an appearance dressed as Nobunaga at the annual Gifu Nobunaga Festival alongside fellow actor Hideaki Ito on horseback. The festival drew in half-a-million people, more than the city's population, with many hoping to catch a glimpse of Kimura.

Television
As a member of the boy band SMAP, he used to co-host a weekly variety show SMAPxSMAP for 20 years until the group's dissolution on New Year's Eve 2016. They welcomed a number of international celebrities such as Michael Jackson, Madonna and Lady Gaga as well as Japanese guests.
He has also occasionally made cameo appearances in other shows, such as on Netflix's Jimmy: The True Story of a True Idiot, and has been a guest on numerous variety shows.

Since 2003, Kimura hosts an annual variety show entitled Santaku alongside comedian Sanma Akashiya to commemorate the start of a New Year. However in 2017, it was broadcast in April due to the official disbanding of the SMAP on New Year's Eve of the previous year.

Gaming

Early in the development of action game Judgment, the developers at Sega and Ryu Ga Gotoku Studio considered using a famous actor to portray the lead Takayuki Yagami.

Writer Toshihiro Nagoshi was afraid audiences would accuse them of toning down the character due to Kimura's popularity. However, Kimura was open to the team's suggestions and worked with the developers to hone the character. Sega was pleased with Kimura's performance, noting he needed far fewer retakes during recording than they anticipated. Some lines were rewritten to better fit Kimura's delivery, but the writers ensured these changes would not deviate from Yagami's personality. The game's dialogue was recorded in chronological order so players would feel Kimura's voice evolving as Yagami's character develops during the story. Kimura enjoyed his work on the game, and Nagoshi remarked on Kimura's quick response to his messages. In contrast with previous Yakuza titles, the game was not recorded until after the whole scenario was written, which helped Kimura and the other actors.

Due to Kimura's popularity within Judgment, Japanese fans have often nicknamed the game  with "Kimutaku" being a short of Takuya Kimura while "Gotoku" ("Like a" Japanese) as a reference to the original Japanese title of Yakuza.

Kimura reprised his role as Yagami in the sequel to Judgment, entitled Lost Judgment released on September 24, 2021. He announced the sequel in an event entitled "Judgment Day" alongside series creator Toshihiro Nagoshi.

Personal life
Kimura married singer Shizuka Kudo on December 5, 2000. They have two daughters: Cocomi, born on May 1, 2001; and Kõki, born on February 5, 2003.

Other ventures

Product endorsement

As a member of SMAP, Kimura alongside his fellow bandmates were former ambassadors for telecommunications conglomerate SoftBank. He is also well-known for being the previous brand ambassador for the Japanese men's grooming brand GATSBY, promoting its iconic Moving Rubber series. Kimura has been the brand ambassador for several other well-known brands, such as Suntory, Levi's, LINE, and Nikon. He is also known for starring in a series of ads for Toyota, alongside Takeshi Kitano and Hugh Jackman. Kimura and Kitano portray Oda Nobunaga and Toyotomi Hideyoshi, while Jackman portrays the sailor Marco Polo. Together with Beyoncé, Kimura served as the brand ambassador for Japanese fashion brand Samantha Thavasa.

As of 2021, Kimura is the current brand ambassador for McDonald's in Japan, and car manufacturer Nissan. In 2021, he partnered with Ray-Ban to produce two lines of special Ray-Ban Aviators and Wayfarers, with his initials engraved by hand.

Filmography

Film

Television (as actor)

Television (as personality)

Radio

Theatre

Video games

Discography

Go with the Flow (2020)
Next Destination (2022)

Awards

Publications
Kai-Ho-Ku (April 24, 2003) 
Kai-Ho-Ku 2 (September 30, 2011) 
Kimura Takuya (1996) 
Percentage (November 11, 2006) 
Kimura Takuya x Men's Non-No Endless (September 30, 2011)

References

External links
Johnny's net Official Profile（English）

1972 births
Japanese idols
Japanese male film actors
Japanese male pop singers
Japanese male television actors
Japanese male video game actors
Japanese male voice actors
Japanese rhythm and blues singers
Living people
SMAP members
20th-century Japanese male actors
21st-century Japanese male actors
20th-century Japanese male singers
20th-century Japanese singers
21st-century Japanese male singers
21st-century Japanese singers
Japanese baritones